Kawachi Bay (河内湾) was a bay that existed millennia ago in modern Osaka city and surrounds. On its eastern border were the Ikoma mountain range, and the west there was a peninsula where many (pre)historical settlements are found. Both the Yodo River on the northern periphery and the Yamato River on the southern end emptied into it. The alluvium deposits created a sandbar today known as Uemachi Plateau. Eventually the bay was cut off from the ocean by the growing sand peninsula, turning it into a lake called Kawachi Lake (河内湖). Continual deposition in time filled the lake turning it swampy; some centuries later it became an alluvial plain on which most of Osaka Prefecture sits.

The word Kawachi refers to Kawachi Province, which itself means inside the river.

References

External links
 Kawachi bay rendering (japanese)
 City gov produced history book cover showing map of Kawachi Lake (japanese)

Landforms of Osaka Prefecture